KKUM (Korean: 꿈; RR: Kkum; lit. Dream) is a South Korean intimate black and white animated short film made in a minimal set design with Styrofoam in stop-motion. Seoul-born, Los Angeles-based independent director Kim Kang-min confessed using this material because it is inexpensive and fit his $80 budget. This Oscar-qualified short is the first Korean to take grand prize at OIAF and the 3rd film in Ottawa history to win both top short and public prize.

Plot 
With prayers in the daytime and dreams at night, a mother protects her son. The mother's become premonitions to the point of devotion.

Voice cast 
 Kim Kang-min as himself.
 Park Joung-soon as the mother. Kang-min's real mother provided her own voice for the project.

Accolades

References 

2020 films
2020 computer-animated films
Stop-motion animated films
2020 short films
South Korean animated short films